Bocage's weaver (Ploceus temporalis) is a species of bird in the family Ploceidae.
It is found in riparian zones of Angola, southern Democratic Republic of the Congo and northwestern Zambia.

The common name and Latin binomial commemorate the Portuguese naturalist José Vicente Barbosa du Bocage, who described the species in 1880.

References

External links

 Bocage's weaver -  Species text in Weaver Watch.

Bocage's weaver
Birds of Central Africa
Bocage's weaver
Taxonomy articles created by Polbot